Band-Maid is a Japanese rock band formed in 2013, consisting of singer Saiki Atsumi, guitarist/singer Miku Kobato, lead guitarist Kanami Tōno, bassist Misa, and drummer Akane Hirose. The band combines a rock sound with a maid image modeled on Japanese maid cafés. They are currently signed to Pony Canyon, and as of 2023 they have released seven studio albums, two EPs, and numerous singles.

Studio albums

EPs

Live albums

Singles

Digital singles

Music videos

Video albums

Other appearances

Notes

References

Discographies of Japanese artists
Rock music group discographies